Derrick Nnadi (born May 9, 1996) is an American football defensive tackle for the Kansas City Chiefs of the National Football League (NFL). He played college football at Florida State.

Professional career
On December 9, 2017, it was announced that Nnadi had accepted his invitation to play in the 2018 Senior Bowl. On January 19, 2018, it was reported that Nnadi would not be participating in the 2018 Reese's Senior Bowl due to an unspecified injury. Nnadi attended the NFL Scouting Combine in Indianapolis and completed all of the combine and positional drills. His overall performance was described as poor and was a detriment to his draft stock. On March 20, 2018, Nnadi participated at Florida State's pro day and chose to perform the short shuttle (4.97s) and vertical jump (25.5"). He attended a private workout with the New York Jets. At the conclusion of the pre-draft process, Nnadi was projected to be a third or fourth round pick by NFL draft experts and scouts. He was ranked as the seventh best defensive tackle in the draft by Scouts Inc. and was ranked the 11th best defensive tackle prospect by DraftScout.com.

The Kansas City Chiefs selected Nnadi in the third round with the 75th overall pick in the 2018 NFL Draft. The Chiefs traded their third (86th overall) and fourth round (122nd overall) picks to the Baltimore Ravens in exchange for the Ravens' third round pick (75th overall) in order to draft Nnadi.

On June 15, 2018, the Kansas City Chiefs signed Nnadi to a four-year, $3.74 million contract featuring a signing bonus of $959,400.

In Week 11 of the 2019 season against the Los Angeles Chargers on Monday Night Football, Nnadi recorded his first career interception off Philip Rivers in the 24–17 win. The Chiefs went on to win Super Bowl LIV over the San Francisco 49ers, their first championship in 50 years.

On March 20, 2022, Nnadi re-signed with the Chiefs. Nnadi won his second Super Bowl ring when the Chiefs defeated the Philadelphia Eagles in Super Bowl LVII.

Personal life
Nnadi is of Nigerian descent. He attended Corporate Landing Middle School and Ocean Lakes High School in Virginia Beach, Virginia.

Nnadi has celebrated each Chiefs win during the 2019 season by paying the adoption fee for a dog at a local Kansas City shelter.  He celebrated winning Super Bowl LIV by paying the adoption fees for all adoptable dogs at the shelter.

References

External links
Kansas City Chiefs bio
Florida State Seminoles bio

1996 births
Living people
American football defensive tackles
American sportspeople of Nigerian descent
Florida State Seminoles football players
Kansas City Chiefs players
Players of American football from Virginia
Sportspeople from Virginia Beach, Virginia